Aqui d'El-Rock was a Portuguese pioneer punk rock band, created in "Bairro do Relógio", Lisbon (1977), being the first one to be able to record a phonogram in this music style.

Biography 
Aqui d'El-Rock was a band created in "Bairro do Relógio" (aka Bairro do Cambodja) - a deprived neighbourhood of Lisbon, demolished in the late 1990s Lisbon - by Zé Serra (drums), Fernando Gonçalves (electric bass), Alfredo Pereira (electric guitar) and Oscar Martins (voice and electric guitar). The first three had been playing, since 1973, in dance bands, whose repertoire was suitable for parties and other festive occasions. Later on, they played covers of well-known bands such as Black Sabbath, Led Zeppelin, Grand Funk Railroad, and The Stooges, among others.

But, on one hand, the desire to an exclusive dedication to rock sound and to the composition of songs with Portuguese lyrics - inspired by the aesthetics associated with the punk movement – and on the other hand, the Revolution of 25 April 1974 that led to a profound change in the political regime in Portugal, brought about the need of a reorientation of the group's philosophy, henceforth called "Aqui d'El-Rock".

The band, that debuted at the "Clube Atlético de Campo de Ourique" (Lisbon, 29 April 1978), would become the leading figure of one of the first manifestations of punk rock in Portugal, which was emphasized by the publication of two phonograms (1978 and 1979), being that the word "punk" is highlighted on the cover of the first one. The scarce resources used in the sound recording, resulting in its low quality and the use of some instruments built by the musicians themselves, show the group's rebellious character, also expressing their ideal of authenticity, one of the central values in the punk movement.

Using metaphor and irony, their songs dealt with urban everyday situations such as unemployment, marginality and immoderate behaviours. The aggressiveness of the musical and performative style, based on structural simplicity and in the vigorous rhythms of rock 'n' roll style, reinforced its challenging and provocative character - within the universe of modern music - to the complexity and virtuosity of the so-called "symphonic rock", that had been accentuated since the beginning of the 1970s.

After recording their second single in 1979, the group played in shows, along with other recently created bands who developed musical styles also inspired by punk rock (UHF, Os Faíscas, Xutos & Pontapés, among others), and their participation in the first part of the show of the English band Eddie & The Hot Rods (“Coliseu dos Recreios de Lisboa”, July 1978) was important to their career. Furthermore, the song "Há que violentar o sistema", a reference in the band's repertoire, was recorded in one of the first video clips of a Portuguese rock group.

After Alfredo Pereira left the group in mid-1979, Carlos Cabral (electric guitar) and Alberto Barradas (electric guitar and secondary voice) joined the band, that performed in the opening of several shows of foreign artists, namely Lene Lovich (Lisboa and Porto), Wilko Johnson & The Solid Senders and Cheap Trick (Lisboa).

Despite its short career, Aqui d’El-Rock created a repertoire in the Portuguese language and was the protagonist of one of the first manifestations of Portuguese rock. Its pioneering and marginal character inspired the appearance of other similar bands.

Some of their songs are part of revivalist collections, such as Grande Geração Rock (Metrosom, 1997), dedicated to Portuguese rock groups, and Killed By Death Vol. 41 (Redrum, 1998), dedicated to punk rock. In 2001, the Brazilian Ratos de Porão made a version of the song "Eu não sei". In Portugal, the same theme was covered by the Eskizofrénicos and the Speedtracks re-recorded (with adapted lyrics) the classic "Há que violentar o sistema". This song was also newly approached by the Clockwork Boys, in late 2005 and by Avô Varejeira, in 2010.

In 2007, as a celebration of the 30th birthday of the band, the Italian "Rave Up Records" published a limited edition of 500 copies of an EP on red vinyl.

The lyrics of the song "Há que violentar o sistema", was amongst those analysed in the book "As Palavras do Punk", by Paula Guerra & Augusto Santos Silva (Alêtheia Editores, 2016).

Subsequently (from last quarter 1981 to March 1982), the band took the name "Mau-Mau" and created a new repertoire, stimulated by the emerging styles of the new wave sound, as can be heard in the songs edited in a 1982 single (‘Shanghai’ and ‘Vietsoul’).

Concert inventory 
 29/04/1978 - Lisbon, Pavilhão CACO
 06/05/1978 - Cacia
 27/05/1978 - Barreiro, Casquilhos
 03/06/1978 - Leiria
 08/07/1978 - Lisbon, Coliseu ("Eddie & Hot Rods" opening)
 05/08/1978 - Faro, Estádio S. Luís
 29/09/1978 - Condeixa-a-Nova
 21/10/1978 - Covilhã
 18/11/1978 - Lisbon, Brown's Club
 24/11/1798 - Lisbon, Cine-Teatro da Encarnação
 03/02/1979 - Águeda
 10/02/1979 - Castelo Branco
 17/02/1979 - Almada, Canecão
 29/04/1979 - Tomar
 05/05/1979 - Lisbon, Liceu D. Pedro V
 12/05/1979 - Chaves
 26/05/1979 - Coimbra, Olivais
 23/02/1980 - Lisbon, Pav. "Os Belenenses" (1ª parte "Wilko Jonhson" opening)
 18/04/1980 - Paço de Arcos, Nautic School
 25/04/1980 - Lisbon, Alameda da Universidade
 17/05/1980 - Porto, Pav. Infante de Sagres ("Lene Lovich" opening)
 18/05/1980 - Cascais, Pav. of Dramático ("Lene Lovich" opening)
 06/06/1980 - *Porto, Pav. Infante de Sagres ("Uriah Heep") *The contract was paid but no action was taken.
 12/06/1980 - Lisbon, F.I.L.
 14/11/1980 - Lisbon, Pav. Alvalade ("Cheap Trick" opening)
 03/04/1981 - Caldas da Rainha
 11/04/1981 - Lisbon, Clube Oriental de Lisboa
 23/04/1981 - Lisbon, Rock Rendez-Vous
 11/07/1981 - Glória do Ribatejo
 18/12/1981 - Vila Franca de Xira ("Mau-Mau")

Recordings 
 09/06/1978 - 1st single; (Há Que Violentar o Sistema / Quero Tudo) Arnaldo Trindade Studios, Lisbon
 09/08/1978 - Videoclip "Há Que Violentar o Sistema", RTP (Filming in the area of a ruined palace next to the Curry Cabral Hospital, Lisbon)
 ??/??/1979 - 2nd single; (Eu Não Sei / Dedicada - A Quem Nos Rouba) Arnaldo Trindade Studios, Lisbon
 15-16-28/12/1981 & 04/01/1982 - Single "Mau-Mau" ("Xangai" and "Vietsoul"); Arnaldo Trindade Studios, Lisbon
On 15 June 2021, the 2 first historical singles of Portuguese punk, were reissued by Zerowork Records, together, in a single side LP. This 12" includes a fold-out poster with the entire history of the band, (lyrics, photos, posters, interviews and unpublished data). It's available in two versions: - 150 copies in red vinyl (cover on a black background, with red and silver), - 150 copies in black vinyl (cover on a red background, with black and silver).

Other events 
 13/03/1982: Participation in the commercial radio program "Febre de Sábado de Manhã"; Cinema Nimas, Lisbon
 28/03/1982: Participation in the RTP television program "Passeio dos Alegres"; Lumiar Studios, Lisbon
 18/10/2019: The documentary "Zé Pedro Rock'n'Roll" by Diogo Varela Silva, was shown on this date at DocLisboa'19, which includes the themes "Há Que Violentar o Sistema" and "Quero Tudo". This doc became available to the public in theaters on July 30, 2020.

Discography 
 Há que violentar o sistema / Quero Tudo (Single - Metrosom, 1978)
 Eu não sei / Dedicada - a quem nos rouba) (Single - Metrosom, 1979)
 Grande Geração do Rock (collection - Metrosom, 1997)
 Killed By Death Vol. 41 (LP, collection - Redrum Records, 1998)
In 2001, the Brazilian Ratos de Porão made a version of Eu não sei. In Portugal, this theme was covered by the Eskizofrénicos and the Speedtracks re-recorded (with an adapted lyric) the classic Há violentar o sistema. This song also took a new approach by Clockwork Boys at the end of 2005 and Avô Varejeira in 2010.
 Brava Dança (2006) – The song Dedicada (a quem nos rouba) was included in the soundtrack of the documentary by Jorge Pereirinha Pires and José Francisco Pinheiro about the band Heróis do Mar.
 Há que violentar o sistema / Quero Tudo / Eu não sei / Dedicada (a quem nos rouba) (EP, Rave Up Records, 2007) was released in celebration of the band's 30th anniversary in red vinyl.

Related publications 
 As Palavras do Punk by Paula Guerra & Augusto Santos Silva (Alêtheia Editores - 2016)

References

Portuguese punk rock groups
Musical groups established in 1977
Musical groups disestablished in 1981
Music in Lisbon
1977 establishments in Portugal
1981 disestablishments in Portugal